ZB Bank Limited (ZBBL), also known as ZB Bank but commonly referred to as Zimbank, is a commercial bank in Zimbabwe. It is licensed by the Reserve Bank of Zimbabwe, the central bank and national banking regulator.

Location
The headquarters and main branch of ZB Bank Limited are in ZB House, at 21 Natal Road, in Avondale, Harare, Harare, the capital and largest city of Zimbabwe. The geographical coordinates of the bank's headquarters are: 17°47'59.0"S, 31°02'30.0"E (Latitude:-17.799722; Longitude:31.041667).

ZB Life Assurance- Individual Life
ZB Life Assurance products are designed and tailor-made to suit the needs of individuals and households and these products include the following:

1. MoreCover Funeral Plan

2. MoreCover Endowment Plan

3. MoreCover Life Plan

4. The Seed

5. Prime Plan

6. Growthplus Retirement Plan (With and Without Life Cover)

ZB Life Assurance- Group Business
ZB Life Assurance has comprehensive range of products and services that include;

1. Pension Schemes

2. Defined Benefit

3. Defined Contribution

4. Hybrid Pension Schemes

5. Immediate Annuities

6. Selfguard Preservation Fund

7. Investment Management (Pooled or Segregated basis)

8. Guaranteed Fund

9. Market Linked Fund (Growthplus Managed Fund)

10. Group Life Assurance Schemes (with optional ancillary benefits that include Disability Cover and Conversion Option)

11. Group Cash Funeral Plans

12. Credit and Mortgage Protection Schemes

Business Services  

ZB Bank Limited services cover broad areas which are available either as a package or as an unbundled service. These are consultancy, pension fund administration, actuarial, underwriting and investment management services.

Consultancy Services

ZB Bank Limited services offer solutions relating to the provision of Employee and Group Benefits. These include benefits design and advice on the impact of legislative, demographic as well as economic changes and other relevant social trends on the provision of Employee and Group Benefits.

Secretarial Services

ZB Bank Limited services offer administration services to all types of pension funds and group life assurance arrangements. These services include the provision of the following:
1. Database management (from single or multiple payroll points)
2. Accounting services
3. Benefits settlement
4. Reporting on administration and financial performance
5. Compliance management
6. Actuarial assessments
7. Actuarial Services

The following full range of actuarial services is provided both in-house and through our consulting actuaries, Independent Actuaries & Consultants:

1. Benefit design for all types of pension funds and group life assurance schemes.

2. Statutory actuarial valuations of Defined Benefit schemes.

3. Conversion valuations from Defined Benefit to Defined Contribution arrangements or vice versa.

4. Regular reviews of the targeted benefits and contribution rates under Defined Contribution schemes.

5. Advice on pension fund mergers, de-mergers and transfer valuations.

6. Computation of interest additions to Defined Contribution schemes.

7. Product development, pricing and profitability analysis.

8. Expense and mortality investigations.

9. Investment portfolio structuring and matching of assets with liabilities.

10. Investment Management.

ZB Bank Limited provide investment management services for all types of pension funds,

ZB life assurance funds and individual policyholder funds. This encompasses the following:

1. Investment portfolio structuring.

2. Matching of investment asset classes with underlying liabilities.

3. Investment research through analysis of the economy and investment markets.

4. Selection of investment securities.

5. Provision of investments advice.

Overview
ZBBL is the flagship of ZB Financial Holdings Limited, a large Zimbabwean financial services provider whose shares are traded on the Zimbabwe Stock Exchange under the symbol ZBFH.
, ZBBL's total assets were US$439.3 million, with shareholders' equity of US$89.43 million.

Branch network
, ZBBL maintained a network of 49 branches and 10 agencies across Zimbabwe, including at the following locations, as listed in the 2016 Annual Report.

ZimBank lottery
In January 2000, Fallot Chawaua, the Master of Ceremonies of a promotional lottery organised by the Zimbabwe Banking Corporation, announced that Robert Mugabe won the Z$100,000 first prize jackpot. The lottery was open to all clients who had kept Z$5,000 or more in their ZimBank accounts.

History
ZBBL's origins can be traced to 1951. Ten years later, the financial services organisation from which the bank originated had grown to nine branches countrywide. That organisation was sold to the Netherlands Bank of Rhodesia in 1961. In 1972, the company changed its name to Rhodesia Banking Corporation and then to Rhobank in 1979. Following the purchase of majority shareholding by the government, the company changed its name to the Zimbabwe Banking Corporation in 1981. 
   
In 1989, the company was restructured under one holding company, Zimbabwe Financial Holdings Limited. This allowed the bank to operate as a stand-alone subsidiary of a larger financial conglomerate that also owned other non-banking financial services subsidiaries. The acquisition of other subsidiaries over the years allowed the Group to offer a wide range of services which include commercial and merchant banking, hire purchase and leasing as well as trust and executor services.

On 30 October 2006, the Group adopted a new brand and formally changed its name to ZB Financial Holdings Limited. This change coincided with the merger with former Intermarket Holdings. These new subsidiaries included a bank, two insurance companies and a building society. All subsidiaries adopted the ZB brand across the board.

In June 2014, the financial group merged ZB Bank Limited with ZB Building Society, to meet new capital requirements by the Reserve Bank of Zimbabwe

ZB Reinsurance
ZB Reinsurance Limited (ZBRe) is the reinsurance arm of ZBFH, offering a diverse range of reinsurance services.

Established as Intermarket Reinsurance Limited in a joint venture between Hollandia Reinsurance of South Africa and Intermarket Holdings Limited in 1997; the company was renamed ZB Reinsurance subsequent to the acquisition of a majority shareholding in IHL by ZB Financial Holdings Group (ZBFH) in 2006.

ZBRe provides reinsurance solutions to local and regional insurance companies, reinsurers, medical aid societies as well as special type clients/consortiums. 

ZBRe has over the years cultivated lasting partnerships with renowned insurance and reinsurance companies both regionally and internationally, with the view to ultimately entrenching a regional presence.

ZB Reinsurance Limited (ZBRe) is the reinsurance arm of ZBFH, offering a diverse range of reinsurance services.

Established as Intermarket Reinsurance Limited in a joint venture between Hollandia Reinsurance of South Africa and Intermarket Holdings Limited in 1997; the company was renamed ZB Reinsurance subsequent to the acquisition of a majority shareholding in IHL by ZB Financial Holdings Group (ZBFH) in 2006.

ZBRe provides reinsurance solutions to local and regional insurance companies, reinsurers, medical aid societies as well as special type clients/consortiums. 

ZBRe has over the years cultivated lasting partnerships with renowned insurance and reinsurance companies both regionally and internationally, with the view to ultimately entrenching a regional presence.

Board of Directors

1. Charity Manyeruke; DPhil, MSc, BSc. (Chair)

2. Peter Baka Nyoni; MBA, MA, BA, Adv. Dip in Theology

3. Ronald Mutandagayi; B.Acc, MBL, Chartered Accountant (CEO)

4. Fanuel Kapanje; B.Acc, B.Compt, Chartered Accountant

5. Olatunde Akerele; LLB, MBA (Finance)

6. Terekuona Sydney Bvurere; B.Acc.

7. Pamela Chiromo; B.Compt, ACCA, MBA

8. Jacob Mutevedzi; LLB
	
9. Alexio Zambezi Mangwiro; BSc Public Health.

Shareholding
The shareholding in “ZB Financial Holdings Limited” the holding company of the bank, is as illustrated in the table below:

ZB Financial Group
The subsidiaries of ZB Financial Holdings Limited include the following:

See also
List of banks in Zimbabwe
Reserve Bank of Zimbabwe
Economy of Zimbabwe

References

External links
Profile of ZB Financial Holdings At Reuters.com
ZB Returns to Profitability As of 24 March 2016.

Banks of Zimbabwe
Banks established in 1951
Companies based in Harare
1951 establishments in Southern Rhodesia